Amor real (English: Royal Love) is a Mexican telenovela produced by Carla Estrada for Televisa, broadcast by Canal de las Estrellas (now known simply as Las Estrellas). It originally aired from June 9 to October 17, 2003. Amor real is an historical drama set in the Mexican post-independence period of the mid-19th century. The telenovela aired on Univision in the United States, REN TV in Russia and La 1 in Spain, among others. It was successfully distributed to many countries worldwide. Also, in 2005, Amor real was released on DVD and it became the first telenovela to be released with English subtitles. Televisa has released an abridged DVD version of the telenovela in several countries.

The cast and crew of the telenovela received many accolades, including the TVyNovelas Award for Best Telenovela of the Year at the 22nd TVyNovelas Awards ceremony.

Overview 
In the mid-19th century, in a time of Victorian morality, challenging the rules of the aristocracy to which she belongs, Matilde Peñalver Beristáin, falls in love with Adolfo Solís, an army soldier with no fortune; trusting that her father, Hilario - a fair and kind man - will let her marry him. But her mother, Augusta, is determined to force Matilde to marry a rich man in order to save the family from bankruptcy. Manuel Fuentes Guerra is the perfect candidate. He is an honourable and handsome young man who has just inherited a vast fortune. Augusta ignores the fact that Manuel is the illegitimate son of Joaquín Fuentes Guerra, a powerful landlord who raped a native girl, and who only recognised Manuel as his heir on his deathbed.

Using all kinds of intrigues, Augusta and her son Humberto send Adolfo to prison and convince Matilde to believe that he is married and has children. Overwhelmed and in despair, Matilde surrenders to her mother's pressure and agrees to marry Manuel, especially after she learns that he has paid the family's debts. Adolfo escapes from jail and immediately goes to look for his beloved Matilde, who has just married Manuel. Desperate, Adolfo manages to secretly speak with Matilde to clarify the misunderstandings. Swearing they will love each other forever, they decide to run away, but Manuel discovers them. Deeply hurt, Manuel is not willing to give her up. He forces her to leave with him, despite her love for Adolfo. After arriving at Manuel's hacienda, Matilde has to put up with Antonia, the former administrator's daughter, who is in love with Manuel.

Meanwhile, Adolfo, after an intense and frantic search finds Matilde and, intending to bring her back, poses as Manuel's new administrator. Manuel, unaware of Adolfo's real identity, sympathises with him and gives him a special, friendly treatment. In spite of the situation, Adolfo has to admit that Manuel is a noble, fair man. At that point, Manuel and Matilde discover that they have been victims of Augusta and Humberto's deceit. As time goes by, the subtle attention and Manuel's avid desire end up conquering Matilde's heart. Suddenly one day, she realises that the love she felt for Adolfo has disappeared and that she's fallen in love with Manuel. Matilde tells Adolfo the truth and urges him to leave.

Heartbroken, Adolfo accepts his reality and leaves the ranch the same day, that Matilde announces to her husband that she's pregnant. The couple's happiness does not last long. Manuel discovers who his new administrator was and, in an instant, everything falls apart. Matilde's pleas and explanations cannot convince Manuel, he feels betrayed once again and cannot forgive her. Driven by anger, Manuel doubts his paternity and throws Matilde out of the hacienda. Soon after that, he starts a compromising relationship with Antonia that will later make his reconciliation with Matilde more difficult. Manuel and Matilde's relationship will suffer and prosper during times of civil unrest, political and societal intrigue, and subterfuge. Only time will tell whether or not they find 'Real Love' with each other or with someone new.

Cast 

 Adela Noriega as Matilde Peñalver y Beristáin Curiel de Fuentes-Guerra 
 Fernando Colunga as Manuel Fuentes-Guerra Aranda
 Mauricio Islas as Adolfo Solís / Felipe Santamaría
 Helena Rojo as Augusta Curiel de Peñalver y Beristáin
 Ernesto Laguardia as Humberto Peñalver y Beristáin Curiel
 Ana Martín as Rosario Aranda
 Chantal Andere as Antonia Morales
 Mariana Levy as Josefina de Icaza de Peñalver y Beristáin
 Ana Bertha Espín as Prudencia Curiel
 Beatriz Sheridan as Damiana
 Mario Iván Martínez as Renato Piquet
 Mauricio Herrera as Urbano de las Casas
 Óscar Bonfiglio as Sixto Valdez
 Adalberto Parra as Delfino Pérez
 Héctor Sáez as Silvano Arzola
 Kika Edgar as Catalina Heredia de Solís
 Íngrid Martz as Pilar Piquet de Márquez

Production 

Amor Real is an adaptation of the telenovela, Bodas de odio, from 1983, based on the novel of the same name, written by Caridad Bravo Adams.  For this version it was adapted by the Italian writer, María Zarattini.
The telenovela was filmed at the ex-hacienda of Tetlapayac and the surrounding area in the state of Hidalgo for a lapse of eight months. Because the story takes place in mid-19th century Mexico, sets of buildings and plazas had to be built.
The production, required the participation of over 1,000 actors, extras, technicians and artisans.
Jorge Avendaño Lührs, Mexican pianist and composer, composed the original score (incidental music).
The opening theme, "Amor Real", was written and performed by the former Mexico-based duo, Sin Bandera.

Adaptation: a lebanese television series named Real love الحب الحقيقي aired on 2018

Reception

Mexico's television ratings 

While on the air in Mexico, the telenovela registered very high ratings, especially in the final weeks of its airing when the telenovela showed an average of 35 points. During the whole five-month run in Mexico, it remained on the #1 spot, with a 60% market share, as reported by Ibope Mexico. Due to the enormous popularity of Amor Real, the entire telenovela was reruned for the second time after a public demand, only four months after the original airing finalized.

International success 
Besides the success in Mexico and Latin America, Amor Real was internationally successful, too. When the telenovela aired during prime time on Univision, it frequently managed to beat leading U.S. networks in the ratings. The series aired on Univision in the U.S. with no subtitles, however. It ranks among Univision’s highest rated telenovelas of all time. The telenovela also had successful results when it aired in Spain, on the Spanish national television, TVE, where it was shown in the afternoon, in 2005. In 2005, Amor Real was released on DVD and it became the first telenovela to be released with English subtitles. The DVD release had very successful sales in the U.S. The international DVD release of the telenovela, also included countries such as Canada, Puerto Rico, France, Italy and Spain.

Awards and nominations 
Here are some of the nominations and wins for Amor Real:

Notes

References

External links 

Official sites 
 Amor real at esmas.com (in Spanish)
 Amor real at Xenon Pictures

Profiles 
 Amor real at terra.com (in Spanish)
 Amor real at univision.com (in Spanish)
 Amor real at Alma Latina
 
 Photo Gallery at rtve.es

Soundtrack
 Amor Real, incidental music

Articles
 10 cosas que no sabías de Amor Real at Univision.com (in Spanish)
 Torturas de antaño eran las modas de Amor Real at Univision.com (in Spanish)

 
2003 telenovelas
2003 Mexican television series debuts
2003 Mexican television series endings
Mexican telenovelas
Spanish-language telenovelas
Televisa telenovelas